The 168th New York Infantry Regiment ( "19th State Militia") was an infantry regiment in the Union Army during the American Civil War.

Service
The 168th New York Infantry was organized at Newburgh, New York, beginning August 22, 1862, and mustered in February 11, 1863, for nine months' service under the command of Colonel William R. Brown.

The regiment was attached to Busteed's Independent Brigade, IV Corps, Department of Virginia, to April 1863. King's Independent Brigade, IV Corps, to June 1863. 3rd Brigade, 1st Division, IV Corps, to July 1863. 2nd Brigade, 2nd Division, XI Corps, Army of the Potomac, to October 1863.

The 168th New York Infantry mustered out on October 31, 1863.

Detailed service
The regiment left New York for Baltimore, Maryland on February 12, 1863 then moved to Norfolk, Virginia Garrison duty at Yorktown, Virginia until June 1863. They participated in Dix's Peninsula Campaign from June 24 until July 7. The regiment was ordered to Washington, D.C. on July 9 then to Funkstown, Maryland. It joined the Army of the Potomac at Hagerstown, Maryland on July 14. The regiment took part in the pursuit of Robert E. Lee to Manassas Gap, Virginia from July 14 to July 24. They then assumed guard duty along the Orange and Alexandria Railroad until October.

Casualties
The regiment lost a total of 38 men during service; one enlisted man killed, one officer and 36 enlisted men died of disease.

Commanders
 Colonel William R. Brown

See also

 List of New York Civil War regiments
 New York in the Civil War

References
 Dyer, Frederick H. A Compendium of the War of the Rebellion (Des Moines, IA:  Dyer Pub. Co.), 1908.
Attribution

External links
 Guidons of the 162nd New York Infantry

Military units and formations established in 1862
Military units and formations disestablished in 1863
Infantry 168